Vorsinka is a rural locality (a village) in Staromatinsky Selsoviet, Bakalinsky District, Bashkortostan, Russia. The population was 14 as of 2010. There is 1 street.

Geography 
Vorsinka is located 23 km northeast of Bakaly (the district's administrative centre) by road. Krasnaya Gorka is the nearest rural locality.

References 

Rural localities in Bakalinsky District